The Rwenzori batis (Batis diops) is an endemic bird native to the Albertine Rift montane forests, where it inhabits altitudes of .

Description
The Rwenzori batis is a small, active black and white Old World flycatcher. The upperparts are dark bluish black with a white stripe along the wing and a white loral spot. The underparts are mostly white except for a glossy bluish black breast band, a black chin spot and black thighs and grey axillaries. The tail is black with the feathers having white tips and white edges on the outer tail feathers. The sexes are similar except that males have yellow eyes and females have been reported sometimes to have orangey-red eyes. Juveniles are similar to adults but the plumage has a more rufous cast. The Rwenzori batis measures  in length, and it weighs .

Voice
The territorial call is a slow low-pitched whistle, which has been described as both ventriloqual and eerie. It is repeated with an interval of 2–4 seconds between each whistle.

Distribution and habitat
The Rwenzori batis occurs in the Albertine Rift from the Rwenzori Mountains in the north to Mount Kabobo in the south. It was also recorded in western Uganda, Rwanda and Burundi.
It also occurs in mixed forest and scrub.

In 2004, it was recorded in Virunga National Park, Mgahinga Gorilla National Park and Volcanoes National Park.

Behaviour and ecology
The breeding biology and habits of the Rwenzori batis are little known. It is a shy, active bird which is constantly moving but tends to keep hidden in the foliage. It is insectivorous, flycatching using short flights but most food is probably gleaned from the foliage and twigs. The male appears to regularly feed the incubating or brooding females; the nest and its contents have never been formally described.

Taxonomy
The Rwenzori batis belongs to the family Platysteiridae, which also contains Margaret's batis, the Cape batis, Forest batis, dark batis and Woodwards's batis. The Rwenzori batis appears to replace the Ituri batis at higher altitudes.

References

Rwenzori batis
Birds of Sub-Saharan Africa
Birds described in 1905
Taxonomy articles created by Polbot